The 2004 European Sevens Championship was a rugby sevens competition, with the final held in Palma de Mallorca, Spain. It was the third edition of the European Sevens championship. The event was organised by rugby's European governing body, the FIRA – Association of European Rugby (FIRA-AER).

Final:
Portugal, 21 - Italy, 14

Final standings

Source:

References

2002
International rugby union competitions hosted by Spain
European
2004–05 in European rugby union
2004–05 in Spanish rugby union